KFF Hajvalia, commonly known as Hajvalia was a women's football club based in village Hajvalia of Pristina, Kosovo that folded in summer 2018. It is the women's section of KF Hajvalia. The club last played in the Kosovo Women's Football League, which is the top tier of football in the country.

History

Withdrawal from competitions
On 13 January 2018, Hajvalia was withdrawal from competitions due to the lack of stadium and the huge expenses.

Return in competitions
On 26 January 2018, Rrahim Pacolli with the aim of return of Hajvalia in competitions, he took running the club and took over the obligations of technical staff and players for the next four months.

Honours

Players

2017–18 UEFA Women's Champions League squad

KFF Hajvalia in Europe
KFF Hajvalia will compete in the UEFA Women's Champions League for the first time in the 2016–17 season, entering at the qualifying round.

References

External links
 
KFF Hajvalia at Soccerway
 KFF Hajvalia at UEFA

Association football clubs established in 2015
Association football clubs disestablished in 2018
Football clubs in Kosovo
Defunct football clubs in Kosovo